The Cathedral Treasure or Sacred Art Museum is a museum incorporated in the Braga Cathedral in Braga, Portugal.

It comprises five collections: Treasure, Carving, Statuary, Azulejos and Bells.

Treasure
The treasure contains a wealth of precious items: 
Clothing from the 16th, 17th and 18th centuries, either Portuguese or Oriental.   
Sumptuous objects used in religious services.
A Hispano-Arab casket of the 10th century in Ivory.
An Iron Cross before which Frei Henrique de Coimbra celebrated the first Mass in Brazil after the arrival of Pedro Álvares Cabral.
Numerous objects of gold, silver and precious stones used for services, like crosses, chalices among others.

Carving
In the museum there is different works of Wood carving like altars, musical instruments, Candelabras, among others.

The two Organs in the Cathedral are part of the museum visit.

Statuary
In the museum there is a collection of different works of sculpture from different periods in different material from the 14th to the 18th centuries. Images of Christ, Virgin Mary and numerous Saints.

Azulejos
In the collection are numerous azulejos including some Hispano-Arab Tiles.

Bells
The museum comprises 200 bells made in different times by the well known local bell industry.

Museums in Braga
Braga Cathedral
Museums established in 1930
Art museums and galleries in Portugal
Christian museums
Religious museums in Portugal
Church treasuries